Paulo Henrique Carneiro Filho (born 13 March 1989), known simply as Paulo Henrique, is a Brazilian retired professional footballer who played as a striker.

Career
Paulo Henrique made his professional debut and scored his first professional goal for Atlético Mineiro in a 1–0 away win against São Paulo in the Campeonato Brasileiro on June 10, 2007. On August 21, 2007, Paulo Henrique signed a 3+2-year deal with SC Heerenveen, in the Dutch Eredivisie. He scored on his debut for SC Heerenveen, scoring two goals in the 5–1 away victory at NAC Breda on December 15, 2007. In February 2009 he scored the first two Heerenveen goals in a 2–3 win at PSV Eindhoven. He was released by Heerenveen at the end of March 2010 because of conflict on terms to re-new his contract.

Paulo Henrique was immediately signed by third-party owner Traffic Group in a four-year contract, via a proxy subsidiary club Desportivo Brasil. He then joined Brazilian Série A club Palmeiras in a temporary deal until 31 December 2011. In August 2010 he returned to Europe for Belgian side Westerlo in another loan.

Paulo Henrique signed for Turkish club Trabzonspor from Desportivo Brasil in July 2011 for €4 million transfer fee. He signed a four-year contract worth an average of €900,000 a season.

On 2 July 2014, Paulo Henrique transferred to Chinese Super League side Shanghai Greenland Shenhua for €4 million transfer fee. On 16 July 2015, Henrique was loaned to fellow Chinese Super League side Liaoning Whowin until 31 December 2015. On 15 July 2016, Henrique was loaned to Primeira Liga club Estoril. On 20 January 2017, he was loaned to Sport Recife.

On 21 July 2017, Paulo Henrique returned to Turkey and joined another Süper Lig side Akhisar Belediyespor on free transfer. On 10 May 2018, Henrique helped Akhisar Belediyespor win their first professional trophy, the 2017–18 Turkish Cup.

Career statistics

Honours
Heerenven
KNVB Cup (1): 2008-09

Akhisarspor
 Turkish Cup (1): 2017-18

References

External links
 
 
  zerozero.pt
 Official website

1989 births
Living people
Brazilian footballers
Brazilian expatriate footballers
Akhisarspor footballers
Clube Atlético Mineiro players
SC Heerenveen players
Sociedade Esportiva Palmeiras players
K.V.C. Westerlo players
Desportivo Brasil players
Trabzonspor footballers
Shanghai Shenhua F.C. players
Liaoning F.C. players
G.D. Estoril Praia players
Campeonato Brasileiro Série A players
Eredivisie players
Belgian Pro League players
Süper Lig players
Chinese Super League players
Primeira Liga players
Expatriate footballers in the Netherlands
Expatriate footballers in Belgium
Expatriate footballers in Turkey
Expatriate footballers in China
Expatriate footballers in Portugal
Brazilian expatriate sportspeople in Portugal
Brazilian expatriate sportspeople in the Netherlands
Brazilian expatriate sportspeople in Belgium
Brazilian expatriate sportspeople in Turkey
Brazilian expatriate sportspeople in China
People from João Pessoa, Paraíba
Association football forwards
Sportspeople from Paraíba